Aki na Ukwa is a 2002 Nigerian family comedy film directed by Amayo Uzo Philips. The film stars Osita Iheme and Chinedu Ikedieze. The film launched the acting careers of the two actors Osita and Chinedu and this film marked their maiden collaboration. The film was critically acclaimed opening to positive reviews and the film has been regarded as one of the finest ever films in Nigerian cinema mainly for the introduction of Osita Iheme and Chinedu Ikedieze in the lead roles playing the so-called characters of PawPaw and Aki respectively. The duo rose to stardom and became overnight sensations in Nigeria for their performance in the film since its release. Since then, the duo have starred together in several films in the lead roles. Chukwuka Emelionwu who was the producer of the film was credited for creating brand characters "Aki" and "PawPaw".

Synopsis
Two brothers cause complete chaos at their home, in their school and basically in their whole village.

Cast
Osita Iheme as Pawpaw   
Chinedu Ikedieze as Aki   
Oby Kechere as Gladys   
Amaechi Muonagor as Mbakwe   
Frances Nsokwu as Dorcas

Legacy 
Chinede Ikedieze's performance alongside fellow little person co-star Osita Iheme in the film is still widely spoken, and the duo (especially Osita's character) has been trending through memes since 2019 in Twitter and other social media platforms globally.

References

External links

Nigerian comedy films
English-language Nigerian films
Igbo-language films
2002 comedy films
2002 films
2000s English-language films
2002 multilingual films
Nigerian multilingual films